Ichthyophis monochrous, the Western Borneo caecilian or black caecilian, is a species of amphibian in the family Ichthyophiidae. It is endemic to northern Borneo and known from western Kalimantan (Indonesia) and Sarawak (Malaysia), likely occurring also in Brunei. It is a little-known species known from only a few specimens. It presumably inhabits tropical moist forest. Adults are likely subterranean.

Description
Ichthyophis monochrous is a moderately slender caecilian. Tail is short (3.8 mm) but distinct. The skin has about 247 ring-shaped folds (annuli) and is strongly glandular. In life the specimen is reported to have been violet-brown in colour.)

References

monochrous
Endemic fauna of Borneo
Amphibians of Indonesia
Amphibians of Malaysia
Amphibians described in 1858
Taxa named by Pieter Bleeker
Taxonomy articles created by Polbot
Amphibians of Borneo